The English rock band The Cure have released thirteen studio albums, six live albums, two remix albums, seven compilation albums, eight box sets, twelve extended plays, and forty-six singles on Fiction Records and Geffen Records. They have also released twelve video albums and forty-four music videos.

Formed in 1976,
the Cure grew out of a band known as Malice. Malice formed in January 1976 and underwent several line-up changes and a name change to Easy Cure before The Cure was founded in May 1978. The Cure's original line-up consisted of Robert Smith (vocals, guitars), Laurence "Lol" Tolhurst (drums) and Michael Dempsey (bass guitar). The band has continued through various line-ups; Smith is the group's only remaining original member. The line-up of the band for their most recent album, 4:13 Dream (2008), consisted of Smith, Porl Thompson (guitar), Simon Gallup (bass guitar) and Jason Cooper (drums).

The Cure's debut album, Three Imaginary Boys (1979), reached number 44 on the UK Albums Chart. The next two albums, Seventeen Seconds (1980) and Faith (1981), were top 20 hits in the UK, reaching number 20 and number 14 respectively. Between 1982 and 1996, The Cure released seven studio albums, all of which reached the Top 10 in the UK. The most successful of these was Wish (1992) which reached number one in the UK and number two on the US Billboard 200. The last three studio albums – Bloodflowers (2000), The Cure (2004) and 4:13 Dream (2008) – have had mixed success, reaching numbers 14, 8 and 33 in the UK respectively.

Albums

Studio albums

Live albums

Remix albums

Compilation albums

Box sets

Other sets

Extended plays

Singles

Promotional singles

Videos

Video albums

Music videos

Other appearances

Notes

References

External links
Discography at official website
Official & unofficial worldwide discography

Discography
Rock music group discographies
New wave discographies